The World of David Bowie is a compilation album by English singer-songwriter David Bowie, released on 6March 1970 by Decca Records as part of their The World of... series following Bowie's success with the "Space Oddity" single. It primarily consists of material he recorded in 1967 for Decca subsidiary Deram, including all but four tracks from his debut album David Bowie, as well as three previously unreleased songs — "Karma Man", "Let Me Sleep Beside You" and "In the Heat of the Morning" — and the 1966 B-side "The London Boys". The tracklisting was approved by Bowie himself, while the sleeve photo was provided by David Bebbington. The album was reissued in April 1973 with a Ziggy Stardust-era sleeve photo.

Track listing
All songs were written by David Bowie. Tracks 1, 3, and 6 on side two were previously unreleased.

Side one
 "Uncle Arthur" – 2:07
 "Love You till Tuesday" – 3:09
 "There Is a Happy Land" – 3:11
 "Little Bombardier" – 3:24
 "Sell Me a Coat" – 2:58
 "Silly Boy Blue" – 3:48
 "The London Boys" – 3:20

Side two
 "Karma Man" – 2:58
 "Rubber Band" – 2:17
 "Let Me Sleep Beside You" – 3:24
 "Come and Buy My Toys" – 2:07
 "She's Got Medals" – 2:23
 "In the Heat of the Morning" – 2:55
 "When I Live My Dream" – 3:22

Personnel
David Bowie – vocals, guitar 
John McLaughlin – guitar (on Side 2, Tracks 1 and 3) 
Herbie Flowers – bass 
Tony Visconti – bass, background vocals 
Barry Morgan or Andy White – drums 
Steve Peregrin-Took – pixiephone 
unidentified strings

References

External links 

David Bowie compilation albums
1970 compilation albums
Decca Records compilation albums
Albums produced by Mike Vernon (record producer)
Albums produced by Tony Visconti